1987 saw many sequels and prequels in video games, such as Castlevania II: Simon's Quest, Dragon Quest II, Final Lap, and Zelda 2, along with new titles such as After Burner, Contra, Double Dragon, Final Fantasy, Metal Gear, Operation Wolf, Phantasy Star, Shinobi, Street Fighter and The Last Ninja. The Legend of Zelda was also introduced outside of Japan.

The year's highest-grossing arcade game worldwide was Sega's Out Run. The year's bestselling home system was the Nintendo Entertainment System (Famicom) for the fourth year in a row. The best-selling 1987 home video game release in Japan was Dragon Quest II: Akuryō no Kamigami, while the year's best-selling home video games in Western markets were The Legend of Zelda in the United States and Out Run in the United Kingdom.

Financial performance

Highest-grossing arcade games
The year's highest-grossing arcade game worldwide was Sega's Out Run.

Japan
The following titles were the highest-grossing arcade games of 1987 in Japan, according to the annual Gamest and Game Machine charts.

United Kingdom
In the United Kingdom, Out Run was the most successful arcade game of the year. The following titles were the top-grossing games on the monthly arcade charts in 1987.

United States
In the United States, the following titles were the highest-grossing arcade video games of 1987.

The following titles were the top-grossing games on the monthly RePlay arcade charts in 1987.

Best-selling home systems

Best-selling home video games

Japan
In Japan, according to Famicom Tsūshin (Famitsu) magazine, the following titles were the top ten best-selling 1987 releases, including later sales up until mid-1989.

The following titles were the best-selling home video games on the Japan game charts published by Famicom Tsūshin (Famitsu) and Family Computer Magazine (Famimaga) in 1987.

United Kingdom and United States
In the United States, The Legend of Zelda was the best-selling home video game of 1987, becoming the first third-generation video game (non-bundled) to cross a million US sales that year, followed by Mike Tyson's Punch-Out!! In the United Kingdom, Out Run was the best-selling home video game of 1987, with its 8-bit home computer ports becoming the fastest-selling games in the UK up until then.

The following titles were the top-selling home video games on the monthly charts in the United Kingdom and United States during 1987.

Top-rated games

Major awards

Famitsu Platinum Hall of Fame
The following 1987 video game releases entered Famitsu magazine's "Platinum Hall of Fame" for receiving Famitsu scores of at least 35 out of 40.

Business
 New companies: Acclaim, Apogee, The Bitmap Brothers, Empire Interactive, GameTek, Maxis
 Defunct: Electric Transit, English Software, Muse
 Electronic Arts acquires Batteries Included.
 Atari Games establishes the Tengen division for porting their games to home systems.
 Nintendo of America, Inc. v. Blockbuster Entertainment lawsuit: Nintendo sues Blockbuster for photocopying complete NES manuals for its rental games. Nintendo wins the suit, and Blockbuster includes original manuals with its rentals.
 SSI President Joel Billings acquires the license to the Dungeons and Dragons tabletop role-playing game, setting the stage for the Gold Box line of D&D games.

Notable releases

Arcade
 February 20 – Konami releases Contra
 July 1 – Irem releases scrolling shooter R-Type.
 July – Technōs Japan releases Double Dragon to arcades, distributed internationally by Taito.
 August 30 – Capcom releases Street Fighter, the first game of the series.
 Taito releases Rastan and Operation Wolf.
 Namco releases Wonder Momo, which is their last 8-bit game, Yokai Dochuki, which is their first 16-bit game, Dragon Spirit, Blazer, Quester, Pac-Mania, Galaga '88 and Final Lap.
 Atari Games releases RoadBlasters, Xybots, and APB.

Home
 January 14 – Nintendo releases Zelda II: The Adventure of Link for the Famicom Disk System in Japan only.  The game would go unreleased in America for nearly two years afterwards.
 February 12 – Infocom releases Bureaucracy from author Douglas Adams.
 May 1 – Konami releases Castlevania in North America.
 June 21 – Nihon Falcom releases Ys I: Ancient Ys Vanished for the PC-8801 in Japan only. The game's director is Masaya Hashimoto, and it is the first game in the long running Ys series.
 June – Codemasters release Dizzy – The Ultimate Cartoon Adventure
 July 1 – Nintendo releases Kid Icarus in North America.
 July 5 – the Leisure Suit Larry in the Land of the Lounge Lizards adventure is released by Sierra Entertainment.
 July 13 – Konami releases Metal Gear for the MSX2 home computer platform in Japan and Europe.
 August 15 – Nintendo releases Metroid in North America.
 August 22 – Nintendo releases The Legend of Zelda in America and Europe, a year after being available in Japan.
 August 28 – Konami releases Castlevania II: Simon's Quest in Japan, the second Castlevania title released for the NES/Famicom.
 October – Nintendo releases Mike Tyson's Punch-Out for NES/Famicom.
 October – LucasArts releases Maniac Mansion, the first game to use the SCUMM engine, innovating the point-and-click interface for the adventure game genre.
 November 14 – Sierra On-Line releases Space Quest II: Vohaul's Revenge, the second game in the Space Quest series.
 December 17 – Capcom releases the first Mega Man game in the long-standing series for the NES/Famicom.
 December 18 – Square's Hironobu Sakaguchi releases Final Fantasy for the Famicom in Japan. Originally intended to be the company's last release, the game's success resulted in a prolific series. It was released in the US 3 years later.
 December 20 – Sega releases Phantasy Star on the Master System, featuring a female protagonist.
 FTL Games releases Dungeon Master for the Atari ST.
 Sierra On-Line releases Police Quest: In Pursuit of the Death Angel, the first game in the Police Quest series.
 MIDI Maze for the Atari ST is a first person shooter allowing up to 16 computers to be networked via the built-in MIDI ports for deathmatch-style fights.
 Incentive Software releases Driller, a first person game using 3D filled polygons.
 Ocean Software releases Head Over Heels, an isometric arcade adventure, for  several 8-bit home  computers.
 MicroProse releases Sid Meier's Pirates!, the first game from Meier with his name in the title.
 System 3 releases The Last Ninja.
 Accolade releases Test Drive.

Hardware

 March 28 – Sharp releases the X68000 in Japan.

 April – IBM launches the PS/2 line of computers which introduces VGA graphics and 3.5 inch floppy drives to PCs.
 September – Master System released in Europe.
 October 30 – NEC releases the PC-Engine console in Japan.
 Acorn releases the Acorn Archimedes 32-bit home computer, which brought the game Zarch (later known on other platforms as Virus) to prominence.
 Commodore releases the lower-cost Amiga 500 which became a significant gaming machine, particularly in Europe, and  becomes the best-selling model.
 Atari Corporation releases the XE Game System, or Atari XEGS, a repackaged 65XE computer which is the last in the Atari 8-bit family.
 Master System is released in Japan.
 AdLib sets a de facto standard for PC audio with its Yamaha YM3812-based sound card.
 Namco develops the Namco System 1 arcade system board, followed later in the year by the Namco System 2.
 The IBM PCjr is discontinued after three years.

See also
1987 in games

References

External links
Video Game, Released between 1987-01-01 and 1987-12-31 (IMDb)

 
 
Video games by year
video games